Babalu may refer to:

 "Babalú", a 1939 song popularized by Desi Arnaz in the 1940s
 BaBalu, a 2001 Michael Bublé album
 Babalu, Iran, a village in West Azerbaijan Province, Iran
 The nickname for mixed martial artist Renato Sobral
 Babalu (comedian) (1942–1998), screen name of the Filipino actor Pablito Sarmiento Jr.
 A character in the novel Daughter of Fortune by Isabel Allende

See also
 Babalú Ayé, the spirit of illness and disease in Yoruba mythology
 Babaloo Mandel (born 1949), American writer
 Babilu, another name for Babylon